Bengali Unicode block contains characters for the Bengali, Assamese, Bishnupriya Manipuri, Daphla, Garo, Hallam, Khasi, Mizo, Munda, Naga, Riang, and Santali languages. In its original incarnation, the code points U+0981..U+09CD were a direct copy of the Bengali characters A1-ED from the 1988 ISCII standard, as well as several Assamese ISCII characters in the U+09F0 column. The Devanagari, Gurmukhi, Gujarati, Oriya, Tamil, Telugu, Kannada, and Malayalam blocks were similarly all based on ISCII encodings.

Block

History
The following Unicode-related documents record the purpose and process of defining specific characters in the Bengali block:

References 

Unicode blocks